I Like It Like That is an album by Motown group the Miracles, compiled for the UK market and released on the UK Tamla-Motown label as one of its initial group of six albums in March 1965. There was no equivalent album to this in the USA. It is known as the Miracles' "forgotten album".

This album featured a combination of several new songs along with previously issued material from the group's album from the year before, The Miracles Doin' Mickey's Monkey. New songs included "I Like It Like That" (the Top 30 song, not the better-known Chris Kenner song of the same name), the Bobby Rogers-led flip side "You're So Fine and Sweet", "That's What Love Is Made Of" (another 1964 hit that the group performed on the American International Pictures release, the T.A.M.I. Show that year), and "Would I Love You", a song that became a popular regional hit tune for the group in Pennsylvania and The Midwest. The album also featured a Claudette Robinson-led cover version of the Orlons' number 2 Pop smash, "The Wah-Watusi" and the group's 1963 Top 40 Hit, "I Gotta Dance to Keep From Crying". Several of the group's other 1964 songs, including the chart hits "(You Can't Let the Boy Overpower) The Man in You", "Come On Do the Jerk", and its B-side, "Baby Don't You Go", were not included.

The 1964 recordings "I Like It Like That", "Would I Love You" and "That's What Love Is Made Of" were also included on the only US Miracles 1964 album release, Miracles Greatest Hits From The Beginning, which was the first double album released by Motown Records.

Track listing

Side one

All lead vocals by Smokey Robinson, except where noted.

 "I Like It Like That" (Smokey Robinson, Marv Tarplin)
 "Dance What You Wanna (Sam Cooke, James Alexander, Clifton White)
 "The Wah-Watusi" (Kal Mann, Dave Appell) (lead vocals: Claudette Robinson)
 "Such Is Love, Such Is Life" (Robinson)
 "The Groovy Thing" (Robinson)
 "I Gotta Dance to Keep From Crying" (Brian Holland, Lamont Dozier, Eddie Holland)

Side two
 "That's What Love Is Made Of" (Robinson, Bobby Rogers, Pete Moore)
 "The Monkey Time" (Curtis Mayfield)
 "You're So Fine and Sweet" (Robinson, Rogers, Moore, Ronnie White, Tarplin, Don Whited) (lead vocals: Bobby Rogers)
 "Would I Love You" (Robinson)
 "Dancin' Holiday" (Diane Rogers, Fred Smith, Zelda Samuels)
 "Twist and Shout" (Bert Berns, Phil Medley)

Personnel

The Miracles
Smokey Robinson –  lead and background vocals
Claudette Robinson –  lead and background vocals
Marv Tarplin –  guitar
Pete Moore –  background vocals
Bobby Rogers –  lead and background vocals
Ronnie White –  background vocals

Additional personnel
The Funk Brothers - instrumentation

External links
 [ The Miracles - I Like It Like That (album info) All Music Guide]
 I Like It Like That- by ''The Miracles (Title song-1964)
 Tamla Album Discography
 The Miracles: Bio and Discography,including Tamla T249 info

The Miracles albums
1964 albums
Tamla Records albums
Albums produced by Lamont Dozier
Albums produced by Brian Holland
Albums produced by Smokey Robinson
Albums recorded at Hitsville U.S.A.